Alper Sendilmen (born 4 July 1980), better known as "Alpa Gun", is a German rapper of Turkish descent. In 2004, he got signed to Berlin label Sektenmuzik and has since been a member of rap group Die Sekte.

Discography

Studio albums

Extended plays

Singles

Free tracks 

 1 The title actually means Stop with that nonsense in German, but the word "U(n)fuk" is a wordplay of "Unfug" (meaning Nonsense) and the name Ufuk.

References

External links
 :de:Alpa Gun

German people of Turkish descent
German rappers
1980 births
Living people
Musicians from Berlin
Gangsta rappers